Amisoli Patasoni (February 27, 1901 – January 4, 1962) was an American long-distance runner. He competed in the men's 10,000 metres at the 1920 Summer Olympics. Patasoni was a member of the Zuni Nation and attended Haskell Institute.

References

External links
 

1901 births
1962 deaths
Athletes (track and field) at the 1920 Summer Olympics
American male long-distance runners
Olympic track and field athletes of the United States
Track and field athletes from New Mexico
People from McKinley County, New Mexico
Native American sportspeople
Pueblo people
Haskell Indian Nations University alumni
Olympic cross country runners
20th-century Native Americans